Yangxi may refer to:

Yangxi County (阳西县), a county in Guangdong, China

Towns
Yangxi, Anhui (扬溪), in Jixi County, Anhui, China
Yangxi, Fujian (洋溪), in Meilie District, Sanming, Fujian, China
Yangxi, Daozhen County (阳溪), in Daozhen Gelao and Miao Autonomous County, Guizhou, China
Yangxi, Yinjiang County (洋溪), in Yinjiang Tujia and Miao Autonomous County, Guizhou, China
Yangxi, Hunan (洋溪), in Xinhua County, Hunan, China
Yangxi, Anfu County (洋溪), in Anfu County, Jiangxi, China
Yangxi, Sichuan (洋溪), in Shehong County, Sichuan, China

Townships
Yangxi Township, Guangxi (洋溪乡), in Sanjiang Dong Autonomous County, Guangxi, China
Yangxi Township, Guangchang County (杨溪乡), in Guangchang County, Jiangxi, China
Yangxi Township, Yujiang County (杨溪乡), in Yujiang County, Jiangxi, China

See also
Yang Xi (disambiguation)